Rumon Gamba (born 24 November 1972) is a British conductor.

Biography
Gamba studied music at Durham University, and then went to the Royal Academy of Music in London, where he studied conducting with Colin Metters, George Hurst and Sir Colin Davis.  He became the first conducting student to obtain the DipRAM (the Royal Academy of Music performer's diploma).  He was a 1998 prize winner in the Lloyds Bank BBC Young Musicians Conductors Workshop.  In 1998, he joined the BBC Philharmonic as its Assistant Conductor, and later became Associate Conductor.  He left the orchestra in 2002.

Gamba was Chief Conductor and Music Director of the Iceland Symphony Orchestra from 2002 to 2010.  He first conducted at NorrlandsOperan in northern Sweden in a concert of English music in 2007.  Subsequently, in October 2008, he was named the next chief conductor and music director of NorrlandsOperan, with an initial contract of three years, effective from the 2009–2010 season. In March 2011, Gamba was named chief conductor of the Aalborg Symphony Orchestra, and formally took up the post as of the 2011–2012 season.  His initial contract was for three years.  He stood down from the Aalborg post in 2015.

Following his house debut at English National Opera (ENO) conducting Candide, for ENO's first-ever production of the work, Gamba returned to ENO in 2011 to conduct the world premiere of Nico Muhly's opera Two Boys. In 2005 he had conducted the premiere of the Brett Dean Viola Concerto in London
with the composer as soloist.

During the opening week of the European City of Culture festival in Umeå in January 2014, Gamba conducted a complete Beethoven symphony cycle in the Konsertsalen where each of the nine symphonies was prefaced by the premiere of a new work by a contemporary composer. Gamba commented that the aim was to do something which would "blow away cobwebs". 
The concerts were all broadcast on Swedish radio. Later that year he conducted Elektra in an outdoor production by Carlus Padrissa and La Fura dels Baus staged at a large business park in Umeå, Umestan Företagspark; a film was later issued on DVD.

Gamba has made over 50 CDs of for the Chandos Records label, including their Film Music series. With the BBC Philharmonic, Gamba has recorded works of various composers, including Miklos Rozsa, Richard Addinsell, John Addison, Malcolm Arnold, Arnold Bax, Bernard Herrmann, Erich Wolfgang Korngold, and Ralph Vaughan Williams. With the Iceland Symphony Orchestra, he has recorded music of Vincent d'Indy. He has also recorded music of Lord Berners and Constant Lambert with the BBC Concert Orchestra.

In 2014, Gamba gave the Australian premiere, and a rare concert performance, of the original 1915 version of Sibelius's 5th symphony.

References

External links 
 Official Rumon Gamba website
 Harrison Parrott agency biography of Rumon Gamba
 Philip Lane, liner notes to CHAN 10046, The Film Music of Richard Addinsell
 Lewis Foreman and Graham Parlett, liner notes to CHAN 10126, The Film Music of Sir Arnold Bax

1972 births
Living people
Alumni of Durham University
Alumni of the Royal Academy of Music
British male conductors (music)
21st-century British conductors (music)
21st-century British male musicians